Alf Sadler (1906-1975) was an Australian rugby league footballer who played in the 1930s.

Lower grade Five-Eighth/ Halfback, Sadler replaced the injured Jim Flower for the St. George in the 1930 Final and Grand Final.

Sadler played three first grade games during his career, his debut was against Western Suburbs in Round 4 on 17 May 1930.

In a strange coincidence, his only three first grade games were all against Wests (round 4, the Final and the Grand Final).

Sadler died on 5 July 1975 at Arncliffe, New South Wales.

References

St. George Dragons players
Rugby league players from Sydney
Rugby league halfbacks
Australian rugby league players
1906 births
1975 deaths